4-MeO-MiPT, or 4-methoxy-N-methyl-N-isopropyltryptamine, is a lesser-known psychedelic drug.  It is the 4-methoxy analog of MiPT. 4-MeO-MiPT was first synthesized by Alexander Shulgin and is mentioned in his book TiHKAL (Tryptamines i Have Known And Loved). Subsequent testing by Shulgin on human test subjects showed the effective dose as 20-30 mg (or 0.4 mg per Kg body weight of subject); the onset time between ingestion and the first noticeable effects was 45-60 min, with sensations lasting between 2-2.5 hours. The sensation were significantly milder than those of 4-HO-MiPT, with 4-MeO-MiPT producing erotic-enhancing effects, and few of the visuals common with tryptamines. Very little data exists about the pharmacological properties, metabolism, and toxicity of 4-MeO-MiPT.

See also 
 4-MeO-DMT
 Tryptamine
 Psychedelics, dissociatives and deliriants

External links 
 4-MeO-MiPT Entry in TIHKAL
 4-MeO-MIPT Entry in TiHKAL • info

References

Psychedelic tryptamines
Isopropylamino compounds
Methoxy compounds
Tertiary amines